William Norman Ferguson (September 2, 1902 – November 4, 1957) was an animator for Walt Disney Studios and a central contributor to the studio's stylistic development in the 1930s. He is most frequently noted for his contribution to the creation of Pluto, one of the studio's best-known and most enduring characters, and is the artist most closely associated with that character. He is also credited for developing Peg-Leg Pete and the Big Bad Wolf. Ferguson, known at the studio as "Norm" or "Fergy", was the primary animator of the witch in Snow White and the Seven Dwarfs, the first in a long line of great Disney feature villains. He was also a sequence director on the film.

Career 
After starting at the studio in 1929 as a cameraman, Ferguson switched to the animation department and rose rapidly, despite a lack of formal art training. His early animation of the dog who would become Pluto drew strong response at the studio and on-screen for giving the character a personality and apparent inner life that was considered a great step forward for the young art form of animation. Animators Frank Thomas and Ollie Johnston paid extensive tribute to Ferguson's work in their 1981 book Disney Animation: The Illusion of Life, calling his famous "flypaper sequence" from the 1934 short Playful Pluto- in which the dog is stuck to a piece of flypaper- a "milestone in personality animation...through it all, his reaction to his predicament and his thoughts of what to try next are shared with the audience. It was the first time a character seemed to be thinking on the screen, and, though it lasted only 65 seconds, it opened the way for animation of real characters with real problems."

He is remembered for having worked "rough" and "loose", in animation terms, with a focus on feeling, action, and the character's personality rather than detail, structure, or formal draftsmanship. Fellow animator Fred Moore is quoted as having said of Ferguson, "He doesn't know that you can't raise the eyebrows above the head circle, so he goes ahead and does it and it gives a great effect." Animator Shamus Culhane remembered Ferguson as having produced a high volume of work- about 18 feet a week as opposed to the more average ten at the Disney Studios at the time. (A "foot" of animation- a measurement based on film footage- is sixteen frames).

Norm Ferguson served as a sequence director or directing animator on many of the classic Walt Disney features films from Snow White and the Seven Dwarfs in 1937 through the 1950s, including Pinocchio, Fantasia, Bambi, Cinderella, Peter Pan, and Alice in Wonderland.

Ferguson, who later in life suffered from diabetes, left the Disney Studios with his health and career in decline in about 1953. Immediately after a brief, unsuccessful stint with Shamus Culhane Productions, described by Culhane in his 1986 book Talking Animals And Other People, Ferguson died as a result of a heart attack in Los Angeles, California in 1957.

Ferguson posthumously received the industry's Winsor McCay Award in 1987 and was posthumously inducted as a Disney Legend by the studio in 1999, along with fellow animator Hamilton Luske (also posthumous), among others. The two men are the subjects of chapter five in Thomas and Johnston's Disney Animation: The Illusion of Life, titled "Cartoon Comes of Age: Norm Ferguson and Ham Luske."

Filmography

Feature films

Short films

TV series

References

External links

1902 births
1957 deaths
American animated film directors
Fantasy film directors
Animators from New York (state)
Walt Disney Animation Studios people
People from Manhattan